The Taiwan Nougat Museum is a museum about nougat based in Tucheng District, New Taipei, Taiwan.

Exhibitions
The museum exhibits the cultural relics, traditional wedding and engagement, cake tools and baking etc.

Transportation
The museum is accessible within walking distance North from Yongning Station of the Taipei Metro.

See also
 List of museums in Taiwan
 List of food and beverage museums

References

Food museums in Taiwan
Museums in New Taipei